Monopteryx is a genus of flowering plants in the family Fabaceae. It belongs to the subfamily Faboideae. Members of this genus produce hydroxypipecolic acids in their leaves.

Monopteryx can be distinguished from other members of the Dipterygeae by the fact that:
the two adaxial sepals are almost completely united and cover the floral bud.

References

Dipterygeae
Fabaceae genera